Alkalihalobacillus lonarensis is a Gram-positive, alkalitolerant, endospore-forming, rod-shaped and motile bacterium from the genus of Alkalihalobacillus which has been isolated from the Lonar Lake.

References

Bacillaceae
Bacteria described in 2015